One Track Mind may refer to:

 One Track Mind (Egyptian Lover album), 1986
 One Track Mind (Psychic Ills album), 2013
 One Track Mind (Railroad Jerk album), 1995
 "One Track Mind", a 1961 song by Bobby Lewis